The Saint Petersburg Declaration may refer to:

 Saint Petersburg Declaration of 1868, a treaty prohibiting the use of less deadly explosives that might merely injure and thus create prolonged suffering of combatants
 Saint Petersburg Declaration on Forest Law Enforcement and Governance in Europe and North Asia (2005) - see Illegal logging

It may also refer to:

 St. Petersburg Declaration (St. Petersburg, Florida, 2007), a manifesto calling for reform within Islam - see Secular Islam Summit

See also 

 Convention of St Petersburg (disambiguation)
 Treaty of Saint Petersburg (disambiguation)